The 1922 Kansas Jayhawks football team represented the University of Kansas in the Missouri Valley Conference during the 1922 college football season. In their second season under head coach Potsy Clark, the Jayhawks compiled a 3–4–1 record (1–3–1 against conference opponents), finished in eighth place in the conference, and outscored opponents by a combined total of 104 to 75. They played their home games at Memorial Stadium in Lawrence, Kansas. Severt Higgins was the team captain.

Schedule

References

Kansas
Kansas Jayhawks football seasons
Kansas Jayhawks football